The Indian Seed Vault is a secure seed bank located in a high-altitude mountain pass on the Chang La in Ladakh, India. It was built in 2010 jointly by the Defence Institute of High Altitude Research and the National Bureau of Plant Genetic Resources, and is the second largest seed bank in the world.

History

The Beej Bachao Andolan, or "Save the Seeds Movement," began in the late 1980s in Uttarakhand, India, led by Vijay Jardhari. Seed banks were created to store native varieties of seeds.

Seed storage
The vault stores over 10,000 seeds and 200 plant species. These seeds include apricots, barley, cabbage, carrots, radish, potatoes, tomatoes, rice, and wheat, chosen based on qualities such yield or resistance to temperature, pests and humidity.

See also
Svalbard Global Seed Vault

References

2010 establishments in Jammu and Kashmir
2010 in the environment
Agricultural organisations based in India
Conservation projects
Disaster recovery
Emergency management in India
Gene banks
Indian companies established in 2010
Protected areas of India
Science and technology in India
Seed associations
Tunnels in India